The royal staff or Than Phra Kon (Thai: ธารพระกร) is one of the five royal regalia of the King of Thailand. The staff is made of cassia wood and enclosed at both ends in gold. One end has a knob and there are three tines at the foot. The royal staff is used as a symbol of regal authority as in other cultures around the world, and is associated in Thailand with the guiding of the king's footsteps down the path of justice and equity.

See also
Great Crown of Victory
Royal Nine-Tiered Umbrella
Sword of Victory
Coronation of the Thai monarch

References

Regalia of Thailand